Høvelte is a halt on the Hillerød radial of the S-train network in Greater Copenhagen, Denmark. It is located between Birkerød station and Allerød station and primarily serves Høvelte Barracks. There is only one station platform by the northbound track. Only the five first trains in the morning and the five last trains in the night stop and only at request. On Sundays and in holidays it is the last eleven trains.

Maintenance is done by Høvelte Barracks.

The name Høvelte is relatively new. It was introduced in the 1930s. The former name of the locality was Luserød.

References

External links

Trains stopping at Høvelte

S-train (Copenhagen) stations
Buildings and structures in Allerød Municipality